Emanuel  "Emmy" Bezzina (born October 29, 1947 to Joseph Bezzina and Joan née Caruana) is the co-founder and chairman of the fringe Maltese political party Alpha Liberal Democratic Party. He is also a broadcaster and has regular weekly TV programmes in which he discusses law and social problems on Smash Television.

Emmy Bezzina contested the first European Parliament elections held in Malta in June, 2004, obtaining 717 first-count votes. (0.3%).

External links
 Official Website

1947 births
Living people
Leaders of political parties in Malta
21st-century Maltese politicians